Zony Mash is an album of vintage rarities and non-album B-sides by the funk group The Meters. The album consists of 13 tracks of the band's early works with Josie Records from 1968 to 1971. Eight tracks were originally released as singles, and five tracks were released as bonus tracks on re-issue albums.

Reception
In a review in AllMusic, Richie Unterberger wrote, "On both vocal and instrumental numbers, the band offers first-rate tight yet rubbery funk-soul." He noted stylistic influences and similarities to the music of the era and added "it's more the Meters' own funkified brand of New Orleans R&B than anything else." Steve LaBate of Paste magazine had a positive view and said the album captures the band's sound in their heyday.

Track listing

Personnel
Credits adapted from AllMusic.

Primary artist
Ziggy Modeliste – composer, drums, vocals
Art Neville – composer, keyboards, vocals
Leo Nocentelli – composer, guitar, background vocals
George Porter Jr. – composer, bass guitar, background vocals

Production
 Allen Toussaint – producer
 Marshall Sehorn – producer
Tim Livingston – project manager
 Efram Turchick – project manager 
Rodney Mills – engineer
Bob Irwin – mastering
Al Quaglieri – mastering
Stephanie Kennedy – project coordinator
Eric Schou – design
Jeff Smith – design

References

2003 compilation albums
The Meters albums
B-side compilation albums